The 2018–19 Murray State Racers men's basketball team represented Murray State University during the 2018–19 NCAA Division I men's basketball season. The Racers, led by fourth-year head coach Matt McMahon, played their home games at the CFSB Center in Murray, Kentucky as members of the Ohio Valley Conference. They finished the season 28–5, 16–2 in OVC play to finish second to Belmont on a tiebreaker for the regular season championship with Belmont. They defeated Jacksonville State and upset the short-handed Belmont Bruins to be champions of the OVC tournament. They earned the OVC's automatic-bid to the NCAA tournament where they defeated Marquette in the first round before losing in the second round to Florida State.

Previous season
The Racers finished the 2017–18 season 26–6, 16–2 in OVC play to win the OVC regular season championship. They defeated Jacksonville State and Belmont to become champions of the OVC tournament. They earned the OVC's automatic bid to the NCAA tournament where they lost in the first round to West Virginia.

Roster

Schedule and results

|-
!colspan=9 style=| Exhibition

|-
!colspan=9 style=| Non-conference regular season

|-
!colspan=9 style=| Ohio Valley Conference regular season

|-
!colspan=9 style=|Ohio Valley Conference tournament

|-
!colspan=9 style=|NCAA tournament

References

Murray State Racers men's basketball seasons
Murray State
Murray State
Murray State
Murray State